Bad Habits is a blues album by Canadian musician Colin James, released in 1995 (see 1995 in music). In the U.S., the album was released on Elektra Records. The album was produced, engineered and mixed at Compass Point Studios in Nassau and mastered at MasterDisk in New York City. The album earned James the 1996 Juno Award for "Male Vocalist of the Year". The album had sold 70,000 units in Canada by January, 1999.

Track listing 
 "Saviour" (Coyne, Legget, Smith) – 4:40
 "Freedom" (James, Wilson) – 5:25
 "Standin' on the Edge" (J.L. Williams) – 3:45
 "Real Stuff"  (James, Burgess, Linden) – 4:19
 "Better Days" (James, Burgess) – 4:33
 "I Can't Hold Out" (Willie Dixon) – 4:12
 "Bad Habits"       (Brewer)   – 5:15
 "Forty Four"       (Burnett)  – 4:31
 "Walkin' Blues"    (Robert Johnson)  – 3:25
 "Atlanta Moan"                – 3:11
 "Speechless"       (James)    – 4:15

Personnel 
 Colin James   – vocals, guitars
 Lenny Kravitz – clavinet on "Saviour"
 Mavis Staples – vocals on "Freedom"
 Kim Wilson    – harmonica
 Sarah Dash  – supporting vocals
 Bobby King  – supporting vocals
 Terry Evans – supporting vocals
 Waddy Wachtel  – guitar
James "Hutch" Hutchinson  – bass
 Reese Wynans - piano, organ
 Mickey Curry - drums, percussion
 Rene Spooner - percussion
 "Sax" Gordon Beadle, Johnny Ferreira - tenor saxophone
 Doug James - baritone saxophone
 Bob Enos - trumpet
 Jimmie Jamieson - backing vocals

References

External links 
 Bad Habits

Colin James albums
1995 albums
Albums produced by Chris Kimsey
Warner Records albums